Jason Gray-Stanford (born May 19, 1970) is a Canadian film, television and voice actor. He is best known for playing Lieutenant Randy Disher in the Emmy, SAG and Golden Globe-winning TV program Monk and for voicing the role of Raditz in Dragon Ball Z.

Career
Gray-Stanford earned a BFA degree from the University of British Columbia in theatre. He has done extensive voice-over work for various Japanese anime movies and series, and also contributed background vocals to Russell Crowe's 30 Odd Foot of Grunts album Gaslight.

He played Deputy Bobby Michan in Mystery Alaska and appeared in A Beautiful Mind, both starring Crowe. Other notable film credits includes Flags of our Fathers, Earth To Echo, The Miracle Season, Caroline and Jackie, Lonely Hearts, and Summer Of '84.

Notable television appearances range from his roles on Monday Mornings, Grey's Anatomy, Justified, The X-Files, Bones, and both NCIS and Stargate franchises; as well as the series Republic Of Doyle and the hit Amazon Prime Video series The Boys.

Among his many voice-over performances, Gray-Stanford voiced the role of Donatello in Ninja Turtles: The Next Mutation and was the voice of Sherlock Holmes in Sherlock Holmes in the 22nd Century. He was also the voice of Kento Rei Faun in the anime Ronin Warriors, and was the original English voice of Raditz and Cui in the Ocean Group dub of Dragonball Z, as well as the voice of Shinnosuke in the English dub of Ranma ½ and the voice of Joe Higashi in the Fatal Fury OVAs and film. Gray-Stanford is also recognized as the original voice of Yusaku Godai in Maison Ikkoku.

Personal life

In 2018, Gray-Stanford was diagnosed with heart failure, which was controlled for several years with medications and other treatments. In November 2020, he underwent a successful heart transplant. Doctors told him afterwards that he would have probably lived for only a few more weeks without the transplant.

He became an American citizen in 2019.

Filmography

References

External links

Living people
American male film actors
American male television actors
American male voice actors
American people of Canadian descent
Canadian male film actors
Canadian male television actors
Canadian male voice actors
Canadian emigrants to the United States
People with acquired American citizenship
University of British Columbia alumni
20th-century Canadian male actors
21st-century Canadian male actors
20th-century American male actors
21st-century American male actors
1970 births